National Tertiary Route 322, or just Route 322 (or ) is a National Road Route of Costa Rica, located in the San José province.

Description
In San José province the route covers Pérez Zeledón canton (El General, Rivas, Cajón districts).

References

Highways in Costa Rica